Ayogu Kingsley Ifeanyichukwu  is a Nigerian artist known for his hyperrealist style.

Early life and career
Ayogu was born in 23 September 1994. He hails from Aji Igboeze North L.G.A. Enugu State, Nigeria.

In an interview with BBC Igbo, he said he started painting as a child before developing his style of hyperrealism.

In 2021, Ayogu did a painting of Malcolm X the first of his series Icons in the White House which went viral on the internet. This series was displayed in the exhibition "Just My Imagination (Running Away With Me)" at Hangar in Lisbon.

Style of art
A reviewer described Ayogu's work as having "stunning, lens-like detail" depicting "situations with a wide spectrum of displayed emotion through tears, despair and affinity. The viewer of his pieces is compelled to feel connected to the paintings."

In an interview with BBC Igbo, he described his major challenge as having to import his tools. In an article on Guardian Newspaper his art was described as "terrifyingly visceral, so lifelike you feel you could touch them".

Reviews 
Ayogu’s paintings which seek to express themes of daily experience of human life and nature has been defined as poetry that speaks to create pulsating appeal to the conscience of people.

Awards 

 Winner Best Experiment Artist at LIMCAF 2016
 Winner Future Awards Africa 2020 category (Arts)

References

21st-century Nigerian painters
Living people
1994 births
People from Enugu